Lars Sund (born 1953 in Jakobstad, Finland), is a Finland-Swedish author. He studied English, Swedish and comparative literature at the Åbo Akademi University and resides in Uppsala, Sweden. 

Although basically a novelist, in his latest book in 2010 he revealed his favourite hobby, ornithology, and writing essays about his meetings with birds.

Claes Olsson has made a movie called Colorado Avenue, which is based on Sund's books Colorado Avenue and Lanthandlerskans son.

Lars Sund's five latest books have been translated to Finnish.

Bibliography
Ögonblick - 1974
Natten är ännu ung - 1975
Vinterhamn - 1983
Colorado Avenue - 1991
Lanthandlerskans son - 1997
Eriks bok - 2003
En lycklig liten ö - 2007
En morgontrött fågelskådares bekännelser, Dagboksblad maj-december - 2010

Awards
The Runeberg Award 1992
Thanks for the Book Award 1993 (Colorado Avenue)
The Lars Widding Award 1998
Nominated for the Finlandia Prize in 1997 (Lanthandlerskans son)

External links
Colorado Avenue at IMDB

Swedish-speaking Finns
Swedish-language writers
People from Jakobstad
1953 births
Living people
Finnish expatriates in Sweden
Åbo Akademi University alumni